In enzymology, a peptide-N4-(N-acetyl-beta-glucosaminyl)asparagine amidase is an enzyme that catalyzes a chemical reaction that cleaves a N4-(acetyl-beta-D-glucosaminyl)asparagine residue in which the glucosamine residue may be further glycosylated, to yield a (substituted) N-acetyl-beta-D-glucosaminylamine and a peptide containing an aspartate residue. This enzyme belongs to the family of hydrolases, specifically those acting on carbon-nitrogen bonds other than peptide bonds in linear amides.

The NGLY1 gene encodes the ortholog of this enzyme in humans.

Nomenclature 

The systematic name of this enzyme class is N-linked-glycopeptide-(N-acetyl-beta-D-glucosaminyl)-L-asparagine amidohydrolase. Other names in common use include:
 glycopeptide N-glycosidase,
 glycopeptidase, 
 N-oligosaccharide glycopeptidase,
 N-glycanase, 
 Jack-bean glycopeptidase, 
 PNGase A, and 
 PNGase F

Structural studies

The enzyme uses a catalytic triad of cysteine-histidine-aspartate in its active site for hydrolysis by covalent catalysis. A peptide with similar functionality was discovered in 2014 by group at Fudan University in Shanghai, China. This peptide also cleaves alpha 1,3 linkages, and has been named PNGase F-II.

References

Further reading 

 
 
 
 

EC 3.5.1
Enzymes of known structure